= Melitta Mew =

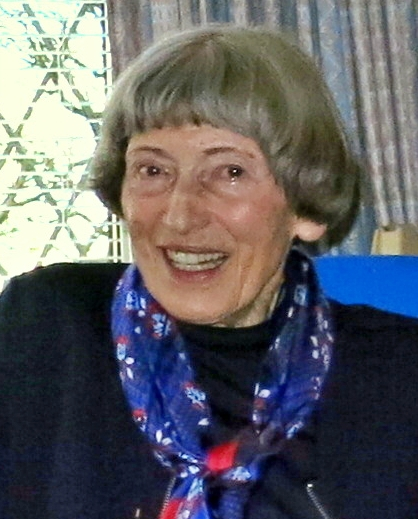
- Photo of Melitta Mew aged 87 made by Dagmar Niemann in May 2016
- Born: January 23, 1929; Nuremberg, Germany
- Died: May 30, 2018 (aged 89); London, United Kingdom
- Occupations: Translator, archival administrator
- Known for: Preservation of Karl Popper's literary estate
- Spouse: Raymond Mew
- Children: 2

Melitta Mew (23 January 1929 – 30 May 2018) was a German‑born British translator and archival administrator. She was the long‑time assistant of the philosopher Karl Popper and played a key role in preserving, organising, and making accessible his literary estate. Her work was instrumental in the establishment of the Karl Popper Collection at the University of Klagenfurt in Austria.

== Early life ==
Melitta Mew was born in 1929 in Nuremberg, Germany, where she grew up in the Glockenhof district. Her formal schooling ended prematurely during the Second World War. Toward the end of the war she was evacuated with her class to Johannisbad in the Giant Mountains, before returning to the heavily bombed city of Nuremberg.

In the immediate post‑war period, she supported herself by translating documents for local residents dealing with the American occupation authorities. In January 1946, at the age of seventeen, she obtained a position as a translator at the International Military Tribunal in Nuremberg. She worked during the major war crimes trials, including the proceedings against Hermann Göring, and from 1948 served as a court correspondent for the American Public Relations Office during the subsequent Nuremberg Trials.

== Move to the United Kingdom ==
In 1950, Mew moved to Düsseldorf, where she met the British citizen Raymond Mew, whom she later married. From 1952 onward, she lived permanently in London and became a British citizen. The couple had two sons, born in 1953 and 1959. For several decades, Mew focused primarily on family life, while maintaining close personal ties to her native city of Nuremberg.

== Professional career ==
=== Work at academic institutions ===
In 1981, Mew returned to professional employment. She initially worked as a secretary at the Royal Institute of International Affairs (Chatham House) in London. From 1982 she was employed at the London School of Economics as secretary and translator for Karl Popper, and in 1985 became his personal assistant.

Following the death of Popper’s wife Hennie in 1985, Mew also assisted him in organisational and practical matters. After an unsuccessful attempt by Popper to resume academic life in Vienna, he returned in 1986 to the London area and settled near the Mew family, enabling close collaboration during the final years of his life.

=== Collaboration with Karl Popper ===
Mew managed Popper’s correspondence, organised his travel and appointments, accompanied him on international visits, and translated texts and lectures. During this period, Popper remained active in international intellectual life and received numerous visitors from politics, science, and culture. Mew also contributed to German‑language editions of Popper’s works, including Conjectures and Refutations.

== Karl Popper archive ==
After Popper’s death in 1994, Melitta and Raymond Mew inherited his literary estate. In 1995, they transferred Popper’s manuscripts, personal library, and a valuable collection of antiquarian books to the University of Klagenfurt. Within the university library, the Karl Popper Collection was established and later developed into an internationally recognised research centre.

To ensure the long‑term financial security of the archive, Mew transferred the copyright to Popper’s published works to the University of Klagenfurt in 2008. She also authorised the early release of selected archival materials, including the so‑called Medawar Lecture, first published in 2013. Mew further supported editorial projects such as Karl Popper's German Collected Works and the activities of the Karl Popper Charitable Trust, which promotes research on critical rationalism.

== Death ==
Melitta Mew died on 30 May 2018 in London at the age of 89.
